The Gilded Cage, derived from the phrase "a bird in a gilded cage" meaning living in a luxurious prison, may refer to:

 The Gilded Cage (1916 film), a silent film drama
 The Gilded Cage (1955 film), a British crime film
 The Gilded Cage (2013 film), a French-Portuguese comedy film
 "The Gilded Cage" (The Avengers), a television episode
 The Gilded Cage (Evelyn De Morgan painting)
 The Gilded Cage (Saint George Hare painting), 1908
 A Bird in a Gilded Cage (1900 song)